Iñaki Azkuna Urreta  (14 February 1943 – 20 March 2014) was a Spanish politician of the Basque Nationalist Party. He was mayor of the city of Bilbao, Biscay in the Basque Country, from 1999 until his death. In 2012, Azkuna won the World Mayor Prize, honoring the most outstanding mayors in the world, for his transformation of industrial Bilbao into a cultural centre.

Azkuna died from prostate cancer on 20 March 2014 in Bilbao, Biscay. He was 71 years old.

References

Mayors of Bilbao
2014 deaths
1943 births
People from Durango, Biscay
Basque Nationalist Party politicians
Deaths from prostate cancer
University of Salamanca alumni
Deaths from cancer in Spain
20th-century Spanish physicians
Academic staff of the University of the Basque Country
Chevaliers of the Légion d'honneur